A Tale of the House of the Wolfings and All the Kindreds of the Mark is a fantasy novel by William Morris, perhaps the first modern fantasy writer to unite an imaginary world with the element of the supernatural, and thus the precursor of much of present-day fantasy literature. It was first published in hardcover by Reeves and Turner in 1889.

The book, written in a combination of prose and verse, influenced J. R. R. Tolkien's popular The Lord of the Rings.

Context 

This work and its successor, The Roots of the Mountains, were to some degree historical novels, with little or no magic. Morris went on to develop the new genre established in this work in such later fantasies as Child Christopher and Goldilind the Fair, The Wood Beyond the World, The Well at the World's End, and The Water of the Wondrous Isles.

Book

Plot 

The House of the Wolfings is a romantically reconstructed portrait of the lives of the Germanic Gothic tribes, written in an archaic style and incorporating a large amount of poetry. Morris combines his own idealistic views with what was actually known at the time of his subjects' folkways and language. He portrays them as simple and hardworking, galvanized into heroic action to defend their families and liberty by the attacks of imperial Rome.

Morris's Goths inhabit an area called the Mark on a river in the forest of Mirkwood, divided into the Upper-mark, the Mid-mark and the Nether-mark. They worship their gods Odin and Tyr by sacrificing horses, and rely on seers who foretell the future and serve as psychic news-gatherers.

The men of the Mark choose two War Dukes to lead them against their enemies, one each from the House of the Wolfings and the House of the Laxings. The Wolfing war leader is Thiodolf, a man of mysterious and perhaps divine antecedents, whose ability to lead is threatened by his possession of a magnificent dwarf-made mail-shirt which, unknown to him, is cursed. He is supported by his lover the Wood Sun and their daughter the Hall Sun, who are related to the gods.

Publication 

The book was first published in hardcover by Reeves and Turner in 1889. The edition was set in the Chiswick Press's 1854 typeface Basle Roman. It was reprinted in 1896 by Longmans, Green. Longmans then reprinted it repeatedly in 1901, 1909, 1912, 1913, and 1914. With Morris's works out of copyright, the book was reprinted by other publishers including Russell in New York in 1966, Routledge in London in 1992, Inkling Books in Seattle in 2003, and Elibron Classics in 2005.

Reception 

The Atlantic Monthly, reviewing the book in 1890, wrote that in it Morris "employs a very perfect art", commenting that the "saga" has a "varied character" and is "a story after the poet's own heart, and that in it wide scope is given for the special traits of his genius". The reviewer explains that "The larger portion is prose, but the speeches are usually given in verse", while the prose is in a "peculiar and artificial style, well sustained, but having the effect to remove the work out of the domain of prose... it brings about an illusion akin to that worked by ordinary verse form. It is very beautiful in its general movement and color, and very noble in phrase; its affectation, even, sympathizes with the Gothic element in the work itself. It is such prose as only a poet could write". The reviewer adds that "the work itself is one of extraordinary beauty in detail, and rich both in minute and broad effects", illustrating this with "Each of his chapters becomes, sooner or later, a picture, admirably grouped, lovely or grand in its unit, but with that care for light and shade and posture, even for costume and framework, which discloses the artist: ... now the scene is under the sunshine of the clearings, often in the shadow of moonlight or the thicket; here a stormy dawn, there a midsummer afternoon; but throughout there is the pencil of the artist."

Oscar Wilde begins his 1889 review in the Pall Mall Gazette with the words "Mr. Morris's last book is a piece of pure art workmanship from beginning to end, and the very remoteness of its style from the common language and ordinary interests of our day gives to the whole story a strange beauty and an unfamiliar charm. It is written in blended prose and verse, like the mediaeval 'cante-fable'". Wilde writes that "From an artistic point of view it may be described as an attempt to return by a self-conscious effort to the conditions of an earlier and a fresher age. ... When the result is beautiful the method is justified ... Certainly, Mr. Morris's work possesses this excellence. His fine harmonies and rich cadences create in the reader that spirit by which alone can its own spirit be interpreted, awake in him something of the temper or romance and, by taking him out of his own age, place him in a truer and more vital relation to the great masterpieces of all time". After an extensive quotation from the text, Wilde concludes that "In days of uncouth realism and unimaginative imitation, it is a high pleasure to welcome work of this kind. It is a work in which all lovers of literature cannot fail to delight."

The literary critic Rachel Falconer, looking back at Morris's House of the Wolfings, Lord Dunsany and David Lindsay, comments that whereas contemporary fantasy fiction has been "excessive" in emulating Tolkien, with his secondary worlds, romance quest, stock characters and story arcs, the earlier and "comparatively forgotten" authors show "how inventive fantasy can be."

The scholar of English literature Anna Vaninskaya argues that in House of the Wolfings and Roots of the Mountains, Morris reveals his socialism by portraying "ancient war leaders who battle on behalf of their communities rather than for personal glory."

Influence 

The House of the Wolfings was one of the influences on J. R. R. Tolkien's popular The Lord of the Rings. In a 1960 letter, Tolkien wrote: 'The Dead Marshes and the approaches to the Morannon owe something to Northern France after the Battle of the Somme. They owe more to William Morris and his Huns and Romans, as in The House of the Wolfings or The Roots of the Mountains." Among the numerous parallels with The Lord of the Rings, Morris has Old English-style placenames such as Mirkwood and the Mark, Germanic personal names such as Thiodolf, and dwarves as skilled smiths (e.g. "How the Dwarf-wrought Hauberk was Brought away from the Hall of the Daylings").

See also 

 The Story of Sigurd the Volsung and the Fall of the Niblungs
 Meduseld – the similar mead-hall in Rohan in J.R.R. Tolkien's Lord of the Rings

References

External links

 
 University of Iowa - list of criticism of The House of the Wolfings

1889 British novels
British fantasy novels
1889 fantasy novels
Novels by William Morris